Clarence Hill (born 26 June 1951) is a Bermudian retired boxer. At the 1976 Summer Olympics he won a bronze medal in the Heavyweight division, making Hill the first athlete from Bermuda to win an Olympic medal, and the only one until 2021.

1976 Olympic results

 Round of 32: bye
 Round of 16: Defeated Parviz Badpa (Iran) KO 3
 Quarterfinal: Defeated Rudy Gauwe (Belgium) by decision, 5-0
 Semifinal: Lost to Mircea Şimon (Romania) by decision, 0-5 (was awarded a bronze medal)

Professional career
After Montreal, Hill remained an amateur, looking for a chance to compete at the next Games in Moscow in 1980; those dreams were shattered when Bermuda boycotted the Games. So, Hill turned professional instead, defeating British club fighter David Fry in England on April 14, 1980. After winning his first twelve fights, Hill took on future WBA champ Tony Tubbs at the University of New Mexico in August 1982. Tubbs won in a unanimous decision, and Hill went back to taking on lesser-known fighters, mostly in the USA . Hill's last bout was in 1986, and he finished with a final pro record of 19 wins (16 by knockout), three losses and a draw.

Clarence Hill was elected to the Bermuda Sports Hall of Fame in 2005.

External links
 
Bernews: Clarence Hill Bio

Bermudian male boxers
1951 births
Living people
Olympic boxers of Bermuda
Boxers at the 1976 Summer Olympics
Olympic bronze medalists for Bermuda
Olympic medalists in boxing
Medalists at the 1976 Summer Olympics
Heavyweight boxers